is a 2014 Japanese mystery thriller film directed by Yoshihiro Nakamura.

Plot
Yuji Akahoshi (Gou Ayano) receives a phone call from an old high school friend, Risako Kano (Misako Renbutsu). She tells him that her co-worker at a cosmetics company was stabbed to death and then doused in flames. Yuji Akahoshi decides to interview workers at the company and others that knew the victim, Noriko Miki (Nanao), for his television show.

Yuji Akahoshi soon discovers that another co-worker, Miki Shirono (Mao Inoue) disappeared the same night of the murder. She was last seen running to the train station shortly after Noriko Miki's death. Yuji attempts to unravel the mystery of Miki Shirono.

Cast
Mao Inoue as Miki Shirono
Gō Ayano as Yuji Akahoshi
Nanao as Noriko Miki
Nobuaki Kaneko as Satoshi Shinoyama
Erena Ono as Eimi Mitsushima
Mitsuki Tanimura as Minori Maetani (Miki's friend from university)
Shihori Kanjiya as Yuko Tanimura (Miki's childhood friend)
Shunsuke Daito as Shingo Eto (Miki's ex-middle school friend)
Misako Renbutsu as Risako Kano 
Shōta Sometani as Hasegawa
Dankan as Kozaburo Shirono (Miki's father)
Yoko Akino as atsuki Shirono (Miki's mother)
Mao Miyaji as Mayama

Music
"All Alone in the World" performed by Serizawa Brothers (Tsukemen)

Reception
The film earned  (US$8,646,060) in Japan.

Patryk Czekaj, in a review on Twitch Film, called the film "one of the most compelling crime thrillers to come out of Japan in the last few years".

Awards and nominations

References

External links
 

2014 films
2010s mystery films
Films directed by Yoshihiro Nakamura
Japanese mystery films
Films based on Japanese novels
Shochiku films
2010s Japanese films